Sant Julià de Lòria is one of the parishes of Andorra, in the far south of that country. It is also the name of the main town of the parish, which at 908 m is the lowest settlement in Andorra. Other settlements in the parish include Bixessarri, Aixàs, Aixovall, Certers, Llumeneres, Nagol, Aixirivall, Auvinyà, Juberri, Fontaneda, and Canòlic. It is bordered by Andorra la Vella in the north, Escaldes-Engordany in the northeast and Catalonia, Spain in the south, east, west, northwest, southwest and southeast.

Education
University of Andorra
 Naturlandia - Tobotronc
 Festa Major de Sant Julià
 Museu del Tabac

Notable people 
 Òscar Ribas Reig (born 1936 in Sant Julià de Lòria) the first prime minister of Andorra in 1982 
 Gilbert Saboya Sunyé (born 1966 in Sant Julià de Lòria) economist and politician. He is currently the Minister of Foreign Affairs

Sport
 Francesc Repiso Romero (born 1964 in Sant Julià de Lòria) sport shooter, he competed in the 2004 Summer Olympics
 Antoni Bernadó (born 1966 in Sant Julià de Lòria) long-distance runner who finished 87th in Men's marathon at the 1996 Summer Olympics, 49th in 2000, 57th in 2004, 58th in 2008 and 74th in 2012. He is the first and so far only athlete to have finished five Olympic Marathons
 Marina Fernández (born 1996 in Sant Julià de Lòria) footballer who plays as a midfielder
 Jordi Aláez (born 1998 in Sant Julià de Lòria) footballer and beach soccer player

References

External links
 
 

 
Parishes of Andorra
Populated places in Andorra